William Pitt Lynde (December 16, 1817December 18, 1885) was an American lawyer,  U.S. congressman, and Wisconsin pioneer.  He represented Milwaukee and southeast Wisconsin in the 30th, 44th, and 45th congresses, and served as the 12th mayor of Milwaukee.  Prior to Wisconsin statehood, he also served as United States attorney and attorney general of the Wisconsin Territory.  Some of his descendants are still influential in Wisconsin business, philanthropy, and politics.

Early life and education
Lynde was born in Sherburne, New York, in December 1817.  His father was a successful merchant and politician, which allowed William excellent education opportunities.  He attended Cortland Academy in preparation for college, and then attended Colgate University.  He finished his collegiate studies at Yale University, in 1838, and was chosen as valedictorian speaker at his commencement.

After graduating from Yale, he went on to attend New York University School of Law, but after one year he transferred to Harvard Law School.  At Harvard, he studied under Joseph Story and Simon Greenleaf.  He graduated in 1841, and that May, was admitted to the bar in New York.

Through his years at Yale and Harvard, he was also accompanied by his brothers Charles (1 year older) and Watts (2 years younger).  They were reportedly very close, due to their shared upbringing and their shared years in education.  Charles and William were both married around the same time, in 1841, and moved to Milwaukee, Wisconsin Territory, to begin their legal careers. But Charles and Watts both died just a few months later, in August 1841, in the destruction of the Erie steamboat.

Wisconsin legal career
Shortly after his arrival in Wisconsin, Lynde started a law firm in partnership with Asahel Finch Jr., which continued for the rest of both their lives.  The firm endured without strife, despite the fact that Finch and Lynde were both active in politics and held opposing party affiliations.  Their firm was originally known as Finch & Lynde, and from time to time included other partners as well.  The firm continued to operate after the death of Finch in 1883 and Lynde in 1885, and continues today as the firm Foley & Lardner—one of the oldest and largest law firms in the country.

Lynde quickly became one of the most respected lawyers in Wisconsin, and for many years was president of the Milwaukee Bar Association.  Lynde was often sought out by other lawyers to consult on their cases.

Political career
Lynde was always among the progressive wing of the Democratic Party.  Before the Civil War, he aligned with Stephen A. Douglas, and after the war, he was glad to see slavery abolished.

Just three years after his arrival in the Wisconsin Territory, he was appointed attorney general by the territory's governor Nathaniel P. Tallmadge.  The next year he was appointed United States attorney, by U.S. President James K. Polk.  Lynde advocated for adoption of the first constitution of Wisconsin in 1846 and 1847, but that document was rejected.  After the second constitution of Wisconsin was ratified by voters in 1848, a new election was to be held for representatives to the 30th United States Congress, which still had nearly a year remaining.  Lynde was chosen as the Democratic Party's candidate for congress in Wisconsin's 1st congressional district, which at that time comprised the southeast corner of the state.  He prevailed in the May 1848 election, receiving 55% of the vote.

During 1848, Wisconsin was apportioned a third congressional seat and the Legislature drew new district lines.  That fall, new elections were set to take place to choose representatives to the 31st United States Congress.  Lynde stood for re-election in the new 1st congressional district.  His law partner Asahel Finch stood as the Whig candidate in that race, and Charles Durkee, another friend of Lynde, ran as the Free Soil candidate.  The vote split fairly evenly between the three men, but Durkee prevailed with 38%.

Lynde's next major election was his run for Wisconsin Supreme Court in 1859.  Feelings about the election were closely tied to people's feelings about the United States Supreme Court decision in Ableman v. Booth, which struck down an anti-slavery ruling of the Wisconsin Supreme Court.  Lynde, as the Democratic candidate, was on the wrong side of that partisan divide.  The election turned out to be quite close, but the results were tainted by irregularities which led the board of canvassers to throw out nearly 40,000 votes—roughly a third of all the votes cast.  In the end, Byron Paine won the election by a margin of just 2,145 votes.

Lynde was elected to the Milwaukee City Council in 1850, and was elected mayor of Milwaukee in 1860.  Throughout the American Civil War, Lynde paid the $300 draft deferment fee for a large number of recent German immigrants, and earned vast popularity and support from Milwaukee's German community.

In 1865, he was elected to the Wisconsin State Assembly, representing Milwaukee County's 2nd Assembly district.  In 1868, he was elected to a two year term in the Wisconsin State Senate.  During the 1869 and 1870 sessions, he represented Wisconsin's 5th State Senate district, then comprising roughly the northern half of Milwaukee County.

Return to Congress
In 1874, the Democratic Party in Wisconsin was in the midst of a coalition with liberal republicans and grangers, known as the Reform Party.  At the Reform Party nominating convention for Wisconsin's 4th congressional district, Samuel Rindskopf, a liquor dealer and an officer in the state liquor dealers' association, won the Reform Party nomination.  The liquor association was advocating strongly and spending significantly to try to repeal or modify the hated Graham Liquor Law, which had placed limits on alcohol sales in Wisconsin.  Throughout the summer, papers took note of the odd bedfellows in Rindskopf's camp, which included past temperance advocates.  It later became known that Rindskopf had spent a reported $20,000 (about $520,000 adjusted for inflation to 2022) to buy support from journalists and convention delegates.

The corruption of the nominating process and the apparently poor character of the nominees led to a crisis in the party membership, with party members openly saying they would support the Republican, Harrison Ludington, rather than Rindskopf.  The final straw came when journalists began to question whether Rindskopf met the citizenship requirements to run for Congress.  Finally, a collection of leading Democrats apparently compelled Rindskopf to abandon the race, just two weeks before the election.  The outgoing congressman Alexander Mitchell, and other prominent Democrats called on Lynde to step in as the Democratic nominee, and he was unanimously ratified by the district caucus in a special session held on October 20, 1874.

After the bitter nominating process, many newspapers were dismissive of Lynde's chances against Ludington, who was then mayor of Milwaukee and quite popular.  But Lynde managed to rally sufficient support and prevailed with 55% of the general election vote.  He went on to win re-election in 1876.

In the House, Lynde served on the Judiciary Committee and was one of the House managers for the impeachment of Secretary of War William W. Belknap.

In 1878, Lynde faced a primary challenge from Peter V. Deuster, a German immigrant who operated several partisan newspapers.  Lynde ultimately stood down, and Deuster took the nomination at the September convention.

Later years
Lynde remained active in the Democratic Party after leaving Congress, but was wary of new populist movements within the party associated with the rising labor and greenback movements.

He remained active in his law firm until his death.  He died suddenly on December 18, 1885, at his home in Milwaukee.  He had been sick for a year, but was not thought to be in critical condition.  He was interred in Milwaukee's historic Forest Home Cemetery. His wife died in 1897 and was also interred there.

Personal life and family

William Pitt Lynde was the second of four sons born to Tilly Lynde and his wife, Elizabeth ( Warner).  Tilly Lynde was a prosperous merchant in Sherburne, New York, and served several years in the New York State Senate and New York State Assembly.  Tilly's brother, Charles W. Lynde, also prospered in business in Sherburne and served in the New York Senate.

The Lynde family were descendants of Deacon Thomas Lynde, who emigrated from England to Charlestown, Massachusetts Bay Colony, about 1634.

Two of William's brothers, Charles J. Lynde and Watts S. Lynde, died in the Erie steamship disaster in August 1841.

William Pitt Lynde married Mary Elizabeth Blanchard, of Truxton, New York, on May 25, 1841.  Mary Blanchard Lynde became a famous philanthropist and social reform advocate, and was the first woman ever appointed to an office of the Wisconsin state government.  She was appointed to the Wisconsin State Board of Charities and Reform by Governor Lucius Fairchild when that organization was first authorized in 1871.

William and Mary Lynde had at least seven children, though one died in infancy.  There also seems to have been a pattern of mental illness in the family, as their eldest son spent the last months of his life in a mental institution and their youngest son died by suicide.

 Their eldest child, Mary Elizabeth "Lillie", married John Fletcher Harper, son of Joseph Wesley Harper, who was one of the Harper brothers who founded Harper & Brothers Publishing Company, one of the predecessors of HarperCollins.  John F. Harper died in 1865, and Mary subsequently married Colgate Baker, a prosperous merchant.  Mary used her wealth to open a school for women in San Francisco, California.  Baker was one of America's largest tea importers in the 1880s, and the Bakers traveled frequently to Japan for business.  Mary died during one such trip in 1890.  Colgate Baker was also heavily invested in silver mines and was financially ruined by the Sherman Silver Purchase Act and the subsequent collapse in the value of silver.
 Their second child, Clara, married Henry Bradley.  This marriage produced Lynde Bradley and Harry Lynde Bradley, who became two of the most important businessmen and philanthropists in Milwaukee's history, forming the Allen-Bradley Company and the Bradley Foundation.  Harry Lynde Bradley's daughter Jane Bradley Pettit and granddaughter Lynde Bradley Uihlein have also played significant roles in Wisconsin's philanthropic history.
 Their third child, Fanny, died in infancy.
 Their fourth child, Eliza, married John Tweedy Crocker, the son of Hans Crocker, another mayor of Milwaukee and an important figure in the development of the city.  John and Eliza moved to Chicago, where he worked for the Chicago, Milwaukee & St. Paul Railroad.  Two of their daughters, Ruth and Gertrude, became prominent activists in the Congressional Union for Woman Suffrage.
 Their fifth child, William Jr., graduated from Yale and began a business career, but struggled with mental illness.  He was committed to the Northern Asylum in 1886 and died there in March 1887, at age 35.
 Their sixth child, Tilly, served on the Milwaukee city council, but lost most of his inheritance in stock speculation and gambling.  After losing his fortune, he served as a deputy tax collector.  He lived the longest of any of Lynde's sons, reaching the age of 55.
 Their seventh child, Azariel Blanchard Lynde, studied law in his father's office, but ultimately decided to become a doctor.  He graduated from Rush Medical College in 1883, but only worked as a practicing physician for a few years before taking a leave of absence.  He traveled for several years before coming to Duluth, Minnesota, where he committed suicide by slashing his own throat in August 1889.  He was rumored to be a habitual user of opium.

Electoral history

U.S. House (1848)

| colspan="6" style="text-align:center;background-color: #e9e9e9;"| Special Election, May 8, 1848

| colspan="6" style="text-align:center;background-color: #e9e9e9;"| General Election, November 7, 1848

Wisconsin Supreme Court (1859)

| colspan="6" style="text-align:center;background-color: #e9e9e9;"| General Election, April 5, 1859

Milwaukee Mayor (1860)

| colspan="6" style="text-align:center;background-color: #e9e9e9;"| General Election, April 3, 1860

U.S. House (1874, 1876)

| colspan="6" style="text-align:center;background-color: #e9e9e9;"| General Election, November 3, 1874

| colspan="6" style="text-align:center;background-color: #e9e9e9;"| General Election, November 7, 1876

References

External links

1817 births
1885 deaths
People from Sherburne, New York
Wisconsin city council members
Wisconsin Attorneys General
Mayors of Milwaukee
Democratic Party members of the Wisconsin State Assembly
Democratic Party Wisconsin state senators
New York (state) lawyers
United States Attorneys for the District of Wisconsin
Yale College alumni
Harvard Law School alumni
Democratic Party members of the United States House of Representatives from Wisconsin
19th-century American politicians
Burials in Wisconsin
19th-century American lawyers